Churs (also Romanized as Chūrs, Chowras, and Chowrs; also known as Choras, Chors, and Jūres) is a village in Churs Rural District of the Central District of Chaypareh County, West Azerbaijan province, Iran. At the 2006 National Census, its population (as a part of the former Chaypareh District of Khoy County) was 2,367 in 636 households. The following census in 2011 counted 2,430 people in 733 households, by which time the district was separated from the county, established as Chaypareh County, and divided into two districts. The latest census in 2016 showed a population of 2,081 people in 660 households; it was the largest village in its rural district.

The location of modern-day Churs proved to be extremely pivotal in Armenian history. On 26 May 451 AD, a decisive battle was fought at the location that would be one of the single most important events in Armenian history. On the Avarayr Plain, at what is modern-day Churs in the West Azerbaijan Province, the Armenian Army under Vardan Mamikonian clashed with Sassanid Persia. Although the Persians were victorious on the battlefield itself, the battle proved to be a major strategic victory for Armenians, as Avarayr paved the way to the Nvarsak Treaty (484 AD), which affirmed Armenia's right to practice Christianity freely.

References 

Chaypareh County

Populated places in West Azerbaijan Province

Populated places in Chaypareh County